Joutel is a Canadian short drama film, directed by Alexa-Jeanne Dubé and released in 2021. The film stars Pierre Curzi and Marie Tifo as Gérard and Jocelyne, an elderly couple who decide, upon finding a dead raccoon in their yard, to take a trip to bury it on their former property in the ghost town of Joutel.

The film was screened as part of Telefilm Canada's annual Not Short on Talent lineup at the Cannes Film Market, and had its public premiere at the 2021 Festival du nouveau cinéma.

The film was a Prix Iris nominee for Best Live Action Short Film at the 24th Quebec Cinema Awards in 2022.

References

External links
 

2021 films
2021 short films
Canadian drama short films
Films shot in Quebec
Films set in Quebec
Quebec films
French-language Canadian films
2020s Canadian films